Agano may refer to:

 Agano, Niigata, a city in Niigata prefecture, Japan
 Agano River, a river in the Horuriku region of Japan
 Agano, Saitama, a village, now part of the city of Hannō
 Agano Station, a railway station Hannō, Saitama
 Agano-class cruiser, warships of the Imperial Japanese Navy
 Japanese cruiser Agano, lead ship of the class
 Agano ware, a type of Japanese pottery

See also